"Preamble" was the first national anthem of the Federated States of Micronesia. It was adopted in 1979 and replaced in 1991 by "Patriots of Micronesia".

The title refers to the preamble of Micronesia's freshly ratified constitution, from which the lyrics are largely derived.

Lyrics

External links 
Listen to "Preamble" (MIDI)

National symbols of the Federated States of Micronesia
Historical national anthems
Oceanian anthems
Federated States of Micronesia songs